Woodburnodon is an extinct genus of microbiotherian marsupial whose fossils have been found on Seymour Island, Antarctica. It lived during the Eocene epoch.

Taxonomy
The genus is represented by single species, Woodburnodon casei, which was described in 2007 from fossils found on the Antarctic peninsula. Woodburnodon is currently the only formally described species in the family Woodburnodontidae, although fossils of a unidentified Early Eocene woodburnodontids have also been found in Patagonia.

Description
Woodburnodon was the largest known member of the order Microbiotheria.

References

Prehistoric marsupial genera
Eocene mammals of Antarctica
Fossils of Antarctica
Microbiotheria